Lawrence William Wismann (born October 9, 1922), better known as Pete Wismann, is a former American football center and linebacker who played five seasons with the San Francisco 49ers. Born and raised in St. Louis, He played college football at Washington University before the war and at Saint Louis University after serving in the marine corps. He previously attended Maplewood High School in Maplewood, Missouri. He also worked as a mason.

References

1922 births
Living people
American football linebackers
American football centers
Saint Louis Billikens football players
San Francisco 49ers players
Players of American football from St. Louis
United States Marine Corps personnel of World War II
Washington University Bears football players
Washington University in St. Louis alumni